Teddy Fresh is an American streetwear brand founded in 2017 by designer and YouTube personality Hila Klein, who is the CEO. Teddy Fresh's registered trademark was filed in July 2017. The Los Angeles, California-based company focuses on high quality pieces with artist collaborations. Consistent with this, Teddy Fresh has collaborated with cartoon brands including SpongeBob Squarepants, Looney Tunes, and Rick and Morty, as well as with singer Elton John.

History 
Klein launched the Teddy Fresh apparel range in 2017. Teddy Fresh products are designed to be “colorful and playful” and are inspired by ‘90s fashion. The apparel is known for featuring pastel and color-block patterns, and products include t-shirts, hoodies, sweaters, and jackets, for men and for women. The brand uses materials such as denim, jacquard, angora wool, and sueded fleece.

Teddy Fresh products have been worn by celebrities such as Post Malone,  Billie Eilish, Imane “Pokimane” Anys and William Osman.

Collaborations 
In 2020, Teddy Fresh collaborated with the animated television series SpongeBob Squarepants.In 2021, Teddy Fresh released clothing in collaboration with the Care Bears brand.

In October 2021, Teddy Fresh worked closely with Japanese artist Yurie Sekiya to translate her unique and accomplished style to the Teddy Fresh clothing creating wearable art. Sekiya brings her own interpretation of “kawaii culture,” inspired by manga, cartoons, toys, and her everyday experiences.

On November 13, 2021, Teddy Fresh hosted a pop-up event in Los Angeles featuring the brand’s November 2021 collection a collaboration with the Looney Tunes brand.

In February 2022, Teddy Fresh announced a new collaboration with singer Elton John called "Teddy Fresh x Elton John” which was “inspired by the way John has revolutionized music and broken boundaries and by his outlandish style and lust for life.” It features "sequins…intricate patchwork and vibrant fabrics that convey Elton’s luxurious and regal taste for fashion and life.”

In March 2022, Teddy Fresh released their "Teddy Fresh x Rick and Morty" capsule collection featuring several of the beloved characters from the Rick and Morty animated sitcom, including the main characters, Rick and Morty, and the long-time family friend of the Smith Family known as Mr. Poopybutthole. In addition to this, other articles of clothing are dedicated to various aspects of the Rick and Morty universe such as Dimension C-137, Mr. Meeseeks, and Snuffles the family dog. The new line includes a range of hoodies, sweatpants, and t-shirts.

Controversies

James Charles Controversy 
In September 2020, fellow YouTuber James Charles came under scrutiny after revealing a new range under his own fashion line, 'Sisters Apparel'. After direct messaging Charles, Ethan Klein, who is Hila Klein's husband, and a popular and controversial YouTuber in his own right, posted a comparison of their designs on Twitter claiming that the choice of color palette and color-block design of the Charles line was identical to Teddy Fresh's most popular hoodie and went on to state that, though their brand was not the first to use this style of apparel, he feared Charles' fanbase, which is significantly larger, may later accuse the Teddy Fresh brand of plagiarism themselves.

The accusations were denied by Charles and subsequently began an online feud between the two YouTubers which, as of November 2020, was seemingly unresolved.

Gone But Not Forgotten Sweater Controversy 
Teddy Fresh came under fire in November 2021 when a Reddit noticed that the piece of art featured on the brand's "Gone But Not Forgotten" sweater design was plagiarized, with the original found in a1990 book of knitting patterns authored by Gary Kennedy. The jumper in question featured vintage-style artwork of a dinosaur in front of a volcano with text including but not limited "Gone But Not Forgotten", "Teddy Fresh", and "Smiling Down Upon Us".  The copied dinosaur design was submitted by a former-employee Teddy Fresh who the Klein's indicate was not employed by the clothing brand at the time and went on to indicate that they were unaware that the graphic was plagiarized. The Kleins later collaborated with Gary Kennedy in the release of a new line of clothing.

References 

Clothing companies established in 2017
2020s fashion
Clothing brands of the United States
American companies established in 2017
2017 establishments in California